Stage Fright is a 2014 Canadian musical comedy slasher film directed by Jerome Sable and is his feature-film directorial debut. The film had its world release on March 10, 2014 at South by Southwest, a VOD release on April 3, 2014, and a theatrical release on May 9. It stars Allie MacDonald as a hopeful young singer terrorized by a killer at a musical theater camp.

Plot
In 2004, Broadway diva Kylie Swanson opened the musical The Haunting of the Opera (a reference to real-life musical The Phantom of the Opera) to a packed audience. However, that same night, she was murdered backstage by an unknown assailant wearing the mask of the play's villain, Opera Ghost. 10 years later in the present-day, Kylie's children Camilla and Buddy have grown up raised by Roger McCall, a former lover of Kylie's and the producer of a musical theater summer camp on the brink of bankruptcy. When Camilla hears that the camp will be producing a kabuki version of The Haunting of the Opera, she decides that she will sneak into auditions one way or another. She manages to convince a camper overseeing the auditions, Joel Hopton, to let her in and Camilla easily impresses the stage director Artie and wins the lead role of Sofia - much to Buddy's dismay.

As the opening day grows closer and closer, Camilla discovers that Artie will only let her perform on opening day as long as she provides him with sexual favors. He emotionally blackmails her by playing her off of Liz Silver, a camper that will do anything to perform on opening night. Camilla tries to ward off Artie's attentions by only making out with him, which disgusts Joel - whom Camilla has largely ignored since the audition. The night before the performance, Artie gives Camilla an ultimatum: either she sleeps with him or he gives the opening night performance to Liz. Camilla initially acquiesces to Artie's overtures, but decides at the last minute that she can't go through with it. After she leaves, Artie is brutally murdered by someone wearing the Opera Ghost mask, but Roger tells everyone that Artie died by car accident. Unwilling to potentially lose a visit from important Broadway agent Victor Brady, who is only willing to watch the performance if Camilla is performing, Roger manages to persuade everyone to perform opening night as planned.

That night, Joel tries to warn Camilla that Artie was killed and that the murderer is still out there, but his warnings go largely unheeded and the show begins. All seems well with the musical and Victor until later in the performance, when Opera Ghost kills campers Whitney, Sam, and Sheila, and stops Liz from taking revenge on Camilla for performing on opening night. This causes a gap in the performance, which the cast tries to fill with impromptu music and dancing while Camilla looks for her missing co-star. She instead finds an ever-increasing number of bodies.

Camilla manages to intervene when she discovers Opera Ghost trying to kill Roger. This killer is revealed to be Buddy, who says that he did it because he did not want Camilla to get involved in the acting world, which he saw as corrupt. Buddy tells Camilla that Roger is the one who killed their mother in a jealous rage. He spent the past 10 years trying to avenge his mother's death, and he wants to kill whoever who's close to Roger. Roger learns the truth, turns violent, manages to free himself, and attacks Buddy, fatally stabbing him to death. He decides to kill Camilla because her brother wanted to kill him. Roger chases Camilla throughout the camp and corners her backstage. Just as Roger is about to kill Camilla, she finds a buzz saw and kills him and stumbles onto stage. The audience initially assumes that this was all part of the show and applauds what they believe to be the finale.

The film then cuts to the Broadway revival of The Haunting of the Opera with Camilla as the lead. As she prepares backstage, Opera Ghost lunges out of the mirror at Camilla, only for it to be a hallucination.

Cast

 Allie MacDonald as Camilla Swanson
 Ella Querin as young Camilla
 Minnie Driver as Kylie Swanson
 Meat Loaf Aday as Roger McCall
 Douglas Smith as Buddy Swanson
Brian Bridger as young Buddy
 Kent Nolan as Joel Hopton
 Brandon Uranowitz as Arthur Phillippe "Artie" Getz
 Ephraim Ellis as Sam Brownstein
 Melanie Leishman as Liz Silver
 Thomas Alderson as David Martin
 James McGowan as Victor Brady
 Steffi DiDomenicantonio as Bethany
 Darren Summersby as Tobe
 Ryan Bobkin as Bobkin
 Leanne Miller as Sheila Kerry
 Adrianna Di Liello as Lithpy
 Chelsey Pozdyk as Whitney
 Rick Miller as the voice of The Metal Killer
 Dan Levy as Entertainment Reporter

Reception

Critical reception has been mixed to negative.  The film has a 37% approval rating on Rotten Tomatoes based on 51 reviews, with an average score of 5.05/10. The website's consensus reads, "There might be a good movie to be made from mashing up the slasher and musical genres; unfortunately, Stage Fright isn't quite it." Metacritic reports a score of 39/100 based on the opinions of 13 critics, indicating "Generally unfavorable reviews".

Fearnet gave the film a positive review and remarked that while the film wasn't particularly scary, it was also "occasionally creepy and frequently quite gory". We Got This Covered and The Austin Chronicle also praised the film, with the latter commenting that it was "the best unconventional operetta since South Park: Bigger, Longer, and Uncut."

References

External links
 
 
 
 
 
 Stage Fright at Library and Archives Canada

2014 films
2014 comedy horror films
2014 independent films
2014 LGBT-related films
2010s Canadian films
2010s English-language films
2010s exploitation films
2010s musical comedy films
2010s slasher films
2010s teen comedy films
2010s teen horror films
Canadian comedy horror films
Canadian exploitation films
Canadian films about revenge
Canadian independent films
Canadian LGBT-related films
Canadian musical comedy films
Canadian serial killer films
Canadian slasher films
Canadian splatter films
Canadian teen comedy films
English-language Canadian films
Films about musical theatre
Films about summer camps
Films shot in Ontario
LGBT-related comedy horror films
LGBT-related musical comedy films
Serendipity Point Films films
Slasher comedy films
Teen LGBT-related films
Teen musical films